Paola Andrea Muñoz Grandón (born April 13, 1986) is a Chilean road bicycle racer, who most recently rode for UCI Women's Team . She competed at the 2012 Summer Olympics in the Women's road race, but failed to finish.

Major results

2004
 3rd  Scratch, Pan American Track Championships
2007
 1st  Road race, National Road Championships
 7th Road race, Pan American Games
 7th Road race, Pan American Road Championships
2008
 National Road Championships
1st  Road race
6th Time trial
2009
 2nd  Road race, Pan American Road Championships
 6th Copa America de Ciclismo
2010
 1st  Road race, National Road Championships
 3rd  Scratch, Pan American Track Championships
 7th Road race, South American Games
2011
 1st Wenduine
 1st Zonnebeke
 3rd Leeuwergem
 4th Muizen
 8th Road race, Pan American Games
2012
 1st  Points race, Pan American Track Championships
 1st  Road race, National Road Championships
 8th Road race, Pan American Road Championships
2013
 Bolivarian Games
3rd  Omnium
3rd  Team pursuit
2014
 1st  Road race, South American Games
 1st  Road race, National Road Championships
2015
 1st Clasico FVCiclismo Corre Por la VIDA
 National Road Championships
3rd Road race
3rd Time trial
 Copa Venezuela
3rd Omnium
3rd Points race
 6th Road race, Pan American Games
 8th Copa Federación Venezolana de Ciclismo
2016
 1st Road race, East Flanders Provincial Road Championships
 1st Gran Premio de Venezuela
 Pan American Track Championships
2nd  Scratch
3rd  Team pursuit (with Carolina Andrea Oyarzo, Constanza Paredes and Javiera Reyes)
 2nd Zizurkil-Villabona Sari Nagusia
 4th Road race, National Road Championships
 4th Clasico FVCiclismo Corre Por la VIDA
 6th Grand Prix de Venezuela
 9th Gran Prix San Luis Femenino
 10th Copa Federación Venezolana de Ciclismo
2017
 1st  Road race, Pan American Road Championships
 1st  Road race, National Road Championships
 1st Premio Comunidad de Cantabria
 1st Stage 4 Vuelta Internacional Femenina a Costa Rica
 6th Road race, Bolivarian Games
2018
 Vuelta Femenina a Guatemala
1st Points classification
1st Stage 4
 6th Road race, Pan American Road Championships
 9th Gran Premio Comite Olimpico Nacional Femenino
2021
 2nd  Road race, Pan American Road Championships
 3rd  Team pursuit, Pan American Track Championships

References

External links

1986 births
Living people
Chilean people of French descent
Chilean female cyclists
Olympic cyclists of Chile
Cyclists at the 2012 Summer Olympics
Cyclists at the 2016 Summer Olympics
Cyclists at the 2015 Pan American Games
People from Santiago
South American Games gold medalists for Chile
South American Games medalists in cycling
Competitors at the 2010 South American Games
Competitors at the 2014 South American Games
Pan American Games competitors for Chile
21st-century Chilean women